Bijan Davvaz is an Iranian mathematician and Distinguished Professor of Mathematics at Yazd University.
He is known for his works on group theory, ring theory and module theory.

Books
 Groups and Symmetry: Theory and Applications
 A First Course in Group Theory 
 Examples and Problems in Advanced Calculus: Real-Valued Functions 
 Hypergroup Theory
 Walk Through Weak Hyperstructures, A: Hv-structures
 Semihypergroup Theory
 Polygroup Theory And Related Systems 
 Fuzzy Algebraic Hyperstructures: An Introduction

References 

Living people
Academic staff of Yazd University
Year of birth missing (living people)
21st-century Iranian mathematicians
Tarbiat Modares University alumni
Distinguished professors in Iran